in silico Plants (isP) is a peer-reviewed open-access, non-profit scientific journal established in 2019 and publishing on all aspects of computational plant biology. The editor-in-chief is Stephen P. Long, environmental plant physiologist, Fellow of the Royal Society and member of the National Academy of Sciences (University of Illinois and Lancaster University). The journal is published through Oxford University Press but owned and managed by the Annals of Botany Company, a non-profit educational charity registered with the Charity Commission for England and Wales.  in silico plants is listed in the Directory of Open Access Journals, and indexed in Scopus 

in silico Plants is the sister journal of AoB Plants, an open-access plant biology journal, and Annals of Botany, a subscription-based botanical journal.

Abstracting and indexing 
The journal is abstracted and indexed in:
 Dimensions
 PubMed
 Scopus

References 

Open access journals
English-language journals
Biology journals